Sir John Gell, 2nd Baronet (1613 – 8 February 1689) was an English politician who sat in the House of Commons at various times between 1654 and 1689.

Early life
He was baptised at Kedleston in October 1613. Gell was the son of Sir John Gell, 1st Baronet of Hopton, Derbyshire, and his wife Elizabeth Willoughby, daughter of Sir Percival Willoughby of Wollaton Hall, Nottinghamshire.

He matriculated at Magdalen Hall, Oxford on 23 November 1632, aged 17.

Career
In 1654, Gell was elected Member of Parliament for Derbyshire in the First Protectorate Parliament. He was re-elected MP for Derbyshire in 1656 for the Second Protectorate Parliament. In 1659 he was re-elected MP for Derbyshire for the Third Protectorate Parliament. 
 
Gell inherited the baronetcy on the death of his father in 1671. He was High Sheriff of Derbyshire in 1673. In January 1689 he was elected MP for Derbyshire but died a month later at the age of 76.

Personal life
Gell married the religious patron Katherine Packer, daughter of Philippa (born Mills) and John Packer of Donnington Castle, Berkshire. Together, they were the parents of four sons and three daughters of whom six survived infancy. Their first child Katherine was baptised in Westminster Abbey in 1645:

 Sir Philip Gell, 3rd Baronet (1651–1719), who married Elizabeth Fagg in 1678.
 Katherine Gell (1645- ), who married William Eyre of Holme Hall and Highlow Hall, Derbyshire.

He was succeeded in the baronetcy by his son Philip. The baronetcy became extinct upon his son's death in 1719.

Descendants
As his son Philip died without issue, his grandson, John Eyre, assumed the surname Gell to inherit the lands at Hopton after Philip's death in 1719. John Eyre Gell was the father of Admiral John Gell and Philip Eyre Gell, who eventually inherited the Gell family fortune, and was himself the father of Philip Gell, MP for Malmesbury and Penryn, and the renowned antiquarian Sir William Gell.

Another grandson, William Eyre, MP for Berkshire, assumed the surname Archer to inherit the estates of Sir John Archer. Among his four children were John Archer (who married Lady Mary Fitzwilliam, a daughter of John Fitzwilliam, 2nd Earl Fitzwilliam), Michael Archer (MP for Beverley), Catherine Archer (wife of Philip Blundell) and Susanna Archer (wife of Edward Harley, 4th Earl of Oxford and Earl Mortimer).

References

1613 births
1689 deaths
Baronets in the Baronetage of England
English MPs 1654–1655
English MPs 1656–1658
English MPs 1659
English MPs 1689–1690
High Sheriffs of Derbyshire
People from Derbyshire Dales (district)